Katugastota (Sinhala: කටුගස්තොට, Tamil: கடுகஸ்தொட) is a suburb of the city of Kandy in Kandy District, Central Province of Sri Lanka. Katugastota is one of the three main entry points to the city of kandy. Two major Highways (A9 and A10) meet at the center of the city which makes Katugastota one of the busiest suburbs in Kandy district.

The suburb has shown rapid development after the old Katugastota bridge which was constructed over 100 years ago by the British was replaced by a new 4 lane one with major upgrades to the road network along the A9 and A10 roads.

Etymology 
The Sinhalese name කටු-ගස්-තොට (Katu-gas-tota) literally means "Port with thorn trees". Another belief is that the name is derived from the Sinhalese name කඩු-ගත්-තොට which means "port with sword-bearers".

History 
According to the histories,  Sri Lanka has been divided into three parts well known as Ruhunu(රුහුණු), Maya(මායා) and Pihiti(පිහිටි), with each of them divided into kingdoms, provinces and districts as per the 'Tun-Sinhale proposal' and Katugastota was the center point of Sri Lanka. The 'Three Sinhala Seemaramaya', together with the '18 Riyan statue of Lord Buddha' still remain to show the division point.

Health care

Hospitals 
Katugastota has two hospitals, the Katugastota Hospital and the Kandy Private Hospital (KPH). It provides both out patient, specialist channeling services and residential treatment facilities.

Investment and financial

Government banks 
The Peoples Bank is located in the Kandy-Kurunegala high way. The Bank of Ceylon Katugastota branch is located in the Madawala Road. The Sampath Bank, Commercial Bank, Seylan Bank and DFCC bank are the private banks in Katugastota. The Sampath bank is located in Madawala road approximately 100 m from the Bank of Ceylon bank. The DFCC Bank is located right before the DFCC bank and the Seylan bank is located in Kandy-Kurunegala highway approximately 200 m from the Katugastota Bridge before St. Anthony's Girls College.

Schools 
Popular and prestigious St. Anthony's College is situated in the center of Katugasthota, and there are few more famous schools such as Sri Rahula college, St. Anthony's girls school, Zahira college, Mahaweli school, Wesswood International etc...

Climate 

Situated in the Central Province, Sri Lanka, Katugastota generally enjoys a cooler and comfortable climate.

See also 
List of towns in Central Province, Sri Lanka.

References

External links 

Populated places in Kandy District
Suburbs of Kandy